The Africa/Brass Sessions, Vol. 2 is a posthumous compilation album by American jazz saxophonist and composer John Coltrane, released in 1974 by Impulse Records. It compiles outtakes from the same 1961 sessions that produced his Africa/Brass album. "Song of the Underground Railroad" and "Greensleeves" were recorded on May 23, while "Africa" was recorded on June 4. On October 10, 1995, Impulse incorporated the tracks issued here into a two-disc set entitled The Complete Africa/Brass Sessions.

Background 
After a successful series of albums for Atlantic Records, Coltrane signed to the developing, more jazz-oriented Impulse! Records. He assembled a 17-piece orchestra and started to record a series of sessions called Africa/Brass with musicians such as trumpeters Booker Little and Freddie Hubbard, trombonist Julian Priester, bassists Paul Chambers and Reggie Workman, reed player Eric Dolphy, pianist McCoy Tyner, and drummer Elvin Jones. The Africa/Brass Sessions, Volume 2 compiled music from the second installment of the sessions in 1961.

Critical reception 

In The Village Voice, Robert Christgau wrote that he "gave up listening" to the rest of Coltrane's posthumous albums but still listens to The Africa/Brass Sessions, Volume 2 "all the time". In a retrospective review, AllMusic's Lindsay Planer praised Coltrane's command of his orchestra and his own playing: "The amazing virtuosity in Coltrane's solos had begun to show signs of the future direction his later avant-garde sides would take." Revisiting his preference of Vol. 2 over the original Africa/Brass, Christgau wrote in 2020 that "the dollops of massed horns that give the album its name contrast far more dynamically against the forward-looking 'Song of the Underground Railroad' than the original album's generic 'Blues Minor.' And while I admit that Elvin Jones is more spectacular on the 1961 'Greensleeves,' the world is a better place with two of 'em."

Track listing

Side one

Side two

Personnel

Musicians 
 John Coltrane — soprano and tenor saxophone
 Booker Little — trumpet
 Freddie Hubbard — trumpet on May 23 session only
 Britt Woodman — trombone on June 4 session only
 Charles Greenlee — euphonium on May 23 session only
 Julian Priester — euphonium on May 23 session only
 Carl Bowman — euphonium on June 4 session only
 Bill Barber — tuba
 Garvin Bushell — piccolo, woodwinds on May 23 session only
 Donald Corrado — french horn
 Bob Northern — french horn
 Robert Swisshelm — french horn
 Julius Watkins — french horn
 Jim Buffington — french horn on May 23 session only
 Eric Dolphy — alto saxophone, bass clarinet, flute
 Pat Patrick — baritone saxophone
 McCoy Tyner — piano
 Reggie Workman — bass
 Art Davis — bass on "Africa" only
 Elvin Jones — drums

Production
 Creed Taylor — record producer
 Rudy Van Gelder — audio engineer
 Eric Dolphy, McCoy Tyner — orchestrations

References

External links 
 

1974 albums
John Coltrane albums
Impulse! Records albums
Albums produced by Creed Taylor
Compilation albums published posthumously

de:Africa/Brass
fr:Africa/Brass
pt:Africa/Brass